Otis Williams (born Otis Miles Jr.; October 30, 1941) is an American second tenor/baritone singer. He is occasionally also a songwriter and a record producer.

Williams is the founder and last surviving original member of the Motown vocal group The Temptations, a group in which he continues to perform; he also owns the rights to the Temptations name.

Early life
Williams was born Otis Miles, Jr. in Texarkana, Texas, to Otis Miles and Hazel Louise Williams. The couple separated shortly after their son's birth. While he was still a toddler, his mother married and moved to Detroit, Michigan, leaving the younger Otis Miles to be raised by both of his grandmothers in Texarkana. Hazel Williams moved her son to Detroit when he was ten years old, where he lived with his mother and his stepfather.

Career

Becoming interested in music as a teenager, Otis Miles, Jr. adopted his mother's maiden name for his stage name, and as Otis Williams put together a number of singing groups. These groups included Otis Williams and the Siberians, the El Domingoes, and the Distants. In 1959, The Distants scored a local hit, co-written by Williams and their manager/producer Johnnie Mae Matthews, called "Come On", with lead vocals by Richard Street. Later Distants recordings were not as successful, and after an offer from Berry Gordy of Motown Records, Williams and his friends/bandmates Elbridge "Al" Bryant and Richard Street quit the Distants. Eddie Kendricks and Paul Williams from The Primes later joined Williams, Bryant, and Franklin to create the Elgins, who signed to Motown in March 1961 as "The Temptations", after being told another group was already using that name.

The Temptations became one of the most successful acts in soul music over the course of nearly five decades, during which singers such as David Ruffin, Dennis Edwards, former Distant Richard Street, Damon Harris, Ron Tyson, Ali-Ollie Woodson, Theo Peoples, Ray Davis and former Spinners singer G. C. Cameron have all been members. The group's lineup changes were so frequent, stressful and troublesome that Williams and Melvin Franklin promised each other they would never quit the group. Franklin would remain in the group until 1994, when he became physically incapable of continuing. Franklin died on February 23, 1995, leaving Otis Williams, then 53, as the last surviving original member of the quintet.

Williams is the co-author, with Patricia Romanowski, of Temptations, a 1988 book that served as both his autobiography and a history of the group. Ten years later, the book was adapted into an NBC television miniseries The Temptations. Williams was portrayed by actor Charles Malik Whitfield.

Although he has served the longest tenure in the Temptations, Williams rarely sings lead, focusing instead on his role as the group's leader and organizer, and as the background "baritone in the middle". Some examples are:
 The Smokey Robinson and Eddie Kendricks written track "Don't Send Me Away" from the LP The Temptations with a Lot o' Soul (1967)
 The intro on the early group song "Check Yourself" (1961)

Most notably, rare showcases for Williams singing lead are:
 "This Guy's in Love with You" from the 1968 albums Live at London's Talk of the Town and Diana Ross & The Supremes Join the Temptations
 The Norman Whitfield-penned tune "I Ain't Got Nothing" from 1972's All Directions 

Williams has provided non-singing (spoken word) contributions to some Temptation songs, including:
 "I'm Gonna Make You Love Me" (1968, a hit duet with Diana Ross and Eddie Kendricks sharing the lead vocals)
 "I'm the Exception to the Rule", from the album Sky's the Limit (The Temptations album) (1971) which features leads from both Eddie Kendricks and Dennis Edwards
 During the opening verse of "Masterpiece" (1973)
 "For Your Love", which is done in a medley with "You Send Me" (led by Ali-Ollie Woodson) on the For Lovers Only album (1995).

In 1989, Otis Williams was inducted into The Rock and Roll Hall of Fame as a member of The Temptations. Williams received an honorary doctorate from Stillman College in May 2006.

Personal life
Williams married Josephine Rogers in 1961; the couple's son, Otis Lamont Miles, was born the same year. He and Josephine divorced in 1964. Otis Lamont Miles was a construction worker who died from falling off a building in a workplace accident in Detroit in 1985.

Williams was engaged to Patti LaBelle. She ended the engagement when he asked her to quit music and become a housewife.

Williams was married to Ann Cain from 1967 to 1973. He married his third wife, Arleata "Goldie" Williams (née Carter), in 1983. Arleata Williams' daughter Elan Carter became 1994's Playboy'''s Playmate of the Month for June 1994.

In popular culture
Charles Malik Whitfield portrayed Williams in the 1998 NBC-TV miniseries The Temptations.Aint Too Proud: The Life and Times of the Temptations, a musical based on Williams' memoir The Temptations premiered at Berkeley Repertory Theater in September 2017. Williams was played by Derrick Baskin. The show then reached Broadway's Imperial Theater, opening March 21, 2019.

References

External links

Otis Williams' official website
Otis Williams interview by Pete Lewis, 'Blues & Soul' March 2010
Otis Williams on AngelFire
Interview with Otis Williams by Gary James at Classic Bands''.

1941 births
Living people
People from Texarkana, Texas
African-American male singers
American soul musicians
The Temptations members
Singers from Texas
Musicians from Detroit
American tenors
American male singers
American male dancers
Record producers from Texas
Motown artists
Songwriters from Texas
American rhythm and blues singers
African-American songwriters